Blue Rock Records was an American record label, a subsidiary of Mercury Records, and like their parent, based in Chicago between 1964 and 1969.

Despite their name, they did not release blues or rock, concentrating almost exclusively on soul music, with a fair number of the singles echoing Chi-town styles popularized by Curtis Mayfield and other local producers and writers.

Highlights included a version of "Mustang Sally" by its author, Sir Mack Rice.

Big names past their hit-making prime, such as (the Shirelles), and in experimental phases (bluesmen Junior Wells and Junior Parker), cut records for the label.

The best known Blue Rock Records artist was Dee Dee Warwick.

Otis Leavill, Tony Diamond, Johnnie Mae Matthews, Little Rose Little, Big Tim & The Empires, Janeen Henry, Big Frank & The Essences, Johnny Moore, Kenny Carlton, Bobby Hutton, The Commotions, Brothers Of Love, Johnny & Jake, Shirley Wahls & Spouse, Renaldo Domino and Dizzy Jones were also on the roster.

The 1990s double compilation album of the label's output, Lost and Found: The Blue Rock Records Story, is out of print.

See also
 List of record labels

References

American record labels
Record labels established in 1964
Record labels disestablished in 1969